Camp Namanu is a summer camp in the U.S. state of Oregon. It was founded as a Camp Fire Girls camp on the banks of the Sandy River in 1924.

Namanu remained a "girls only" camp until the late 1970s when the parent organization, now Camp Fire, made the executive decision to include boys in all areas of the program. However, Camp Namanu did not have boys and girls camping together in the same week until the mid-1980s.

History

During World War II, while Namanu was a girls-only camp, and while local women often worked in shipbuilding, many T2 tankers were made in nearby Portland.  One T2 tanker was named the SS Camp Namanu.

In her autobiography, A Girl From Yamhill, children's author Beverly Cleary talks about her time as a Camp Fire Girl including attending Camp Namanu during the 1920s. Her character, Ramona, is seen sporting a "Camp Namanu" shirt at the beginning of Ramona and Beezus.

Camp Kwoneesum
The Portland Metro Council also operated Camp Kwoneesum northeast of Washougal, Washington. Purchased in 1959, the camp operated from 1965 to 1986. The camp's  were sold to Longview Fibre Company in 1987. The camp featured an artificial lake with canoeing and sailing, and more primitive camping than Namanu.

Other uses
The site is used by the Multnomah Education Service District for part of their Outdoor School program.

Camp Namanu also hosts private rentals, weddings and retreats.

References

External links 
 
 Camp Namanu alumni

Namanu
Buildings and structures in Clackamas County, Oregon
1924 establishments in Oregon